Sebaste was a town of Phrygia Pacatiana in ancient Phrygia, inhabited in Roman and Byzantine times. It was located between Alydda and Eumenia. It became the seat of a Christian bishop, mentioned by Hierocles, and in the Acts of the Council of Constantinople, which its bishop attended. No longer a residential bishopric, it remains, under the name Sebaste in Phrygia, a titular see of the Roman Catholic Church.

Its site is located near Selçikler in Asiatic Turkey.

References

Populated places in Phrygia
Former populated places in Turkey
Roman towns and cities in Turkey
Catholic titular sees in Asia
Populated places of the Byzantine Empire
History of Uşak Province
Sivaslı District